Washington's 9th congressional district encompasses a long, somewhat narrow area in Western Washington, through the densely populated central Puget Sound region, from Auburn and Federal Way in the south to parts of Bellevue in the north. Since 1997, the 9th district has been represented in the U.S. House of Representatives by Adam Smith, a Democrat from Bellevue.

Established after the 1990 U.S. census, the 9th district was originally drawn as a "fair fight" district. The first representative from the 9th district, Mike Kreidler (D), was defeated after one term by Republican Randy Tate; Tate, in turn, was defeated after one term by Smith. Since being first elected in 1996, Smith's moderate voting record and a strong Democratic trend in the Puget Sound region turned the formerly contentious district into a fairly safe Democratic seat.

Al Gore and John Kerry each carried the 9th district, with 53% in 2000 and 2004, respectively. Barack Obama won the district in 2008, with 59% of the vote.

In 2011, the state began the process of redistricting in response to population changes determined by the 2010 census. In the final report by the bipartisan redistricting commission issued in January 2012, the 9th district shifted to the north. The new district covered Bellevue, Southeast Seattle, and Mercer Island, but only went as far south as the southern tip of Commencement Bay in Tacoma. As of the 2022 redistricting, it is a majority-minority district and the second-most Democratic district in the state; only the neighboring 7th district, covering the rest of Seattle, is more Democratic.

Recent results from presidential races

List of members representing the district

Recent election results

2012

2014

2016

2018

2020

2022

See also
2008 United States House of Representatives elections in Washington
2010 United States House of Representatives elections in Washington
2012 United States House of Representatives elections in Washington
2014 United States House of Representatives elections in Washington
2016 United States House of Representatives elections in Washington
2018 United States House of Representatives elections in Washington

References

External links
Interactive Map at Adam Smith's House website
Washington State Redistricting Commission
Find your new congressional district: a searchable map, Seattle Times, January 13, 2012
Congressional Biographical Directory of the United States 1774–present

09